Absolution is the forgiveness experienced in traditional Christian churches in the sacrament of reconciliation (confession).

Absolution may also refer to:

Music
 Absolution (album), a 2003 album by the English band Muse
 Absolution of the dead, part of the traditional Roman Catholic and Eastern Orthodox funeral liturgy
 "Absolution", a bonus song by Megadeth from the 1994 album Youthanasia
 "Absolution", a song by The Pretty Reckless from the 2014 album Going to Hell
 "Absolution", a song by Ghost from the 2015 album Meliora

Drama
 Absolution (1978 film), thriller directed by Anthony Page
 Absolution (2015 film), a Romanian-American crime film directed by Keoni Waxman
 Absolution (Revenge), an episode of the American TV series Revenge
 Absolution, a 2002 play starring Brennan Brown
 Absolution (audio drama), a 2007 Big Finish Productions audio drama

Literature
 "Absolution" (short story), a 1924 short story from the collection All the Sad Young Men by F. Scott Fitzgerald
 Absolution (novel), a 1994 novel by Olaf Olafsson
 Absolution (comics), written and created by Christos Gage with art by Roberto Viacava

Other uses
 Hitman: Absolution, a 2012 video game by IO Interactive
 Absolution (Agents of S.H.I.E.L.D.), 2016
Absolution, a professional wrestling stable consisting of Paige, Mandy Rose, and Sonya Deville

See also
 Absolute (disambiguation)
 Absolutely (disambiguation)
 Absoluteness
 Confession (disambiguation)
 Discharge (sentence)